The Romance of a Gaucho (Spanish: El romance de un gaucho) is a 1930 novel by the Argentine writer Benito Lynch. It forms part of the Gaucho literature movement of the era. In 1961 the novel was adapted into a film of the same title directed by Rubén W. Cavallotti.

References

Bibliography
 Torres-Rioseco, Arturo. The Epic of Latin American Literature. University of California Press, 1961.

1930 Argentine novels
Novels set in Argentina
Novels by Benito Lynch
Argentine novels adapted into films
Gaucho culture